Tiltoniceras is an extinct genus of cephalopod belonging to the family Hildoceratidae. These cephalopods existed in the Jurassic period, from upper Pliensbachian age, Spinatum zone until lower Toarcian, Tenuicostatum zone in what is now Europe, North America and Asian part of Russia.

Description
Moderately involute to very involute shells, strongly keeled without sulci. They are compressed with rounded umbilical edge and nearly flat whorl sides. Ribs can be from strong, through fine, striate to smooth. They are gently sigmoidal to straight and on the venter they are strongly projected forward.

References

External links

Pliensbachian life
Toarcian life
Early Jurassic ammonites of Europe
Ammonites of Europe
Ammonites of Asia
Ammonites of North America
Hildoceratidae
Ammonitida genera